Arsenic poisoning is a medical condition that occurs due to elevated levels of arsenic in the body. If arsenic poisoning occurs over a brief period of time, symptoms may include vomiting, abdominal pain, encephalopathy, and watery diarrhea that contains blood. Long-term exposure can result in thickening of the skin, darker skin, abdominal pain, diarrhea, heart disease, numbness, and cancer.

The most common reason for long-term exposure is contaminated drinking water. Groundwater most often becomes contaminated naturally; however, contamination may also occur from mining or agriculture. It may also be found in the soil and air. Recommended levels in water are less than 10–50 µg/L (10–50 parts per billion). Other routes of exposure include toxic waste sites and pseudo-medicine. Most cases of poisoning are accidental. Arsenic acts by changing the functioning of around 200 enzymes. Diagnosis is by testing the urine, blood, or hair.

Prevention is by using water that does not contain high levels of arsenic. This may be achieved by the use of special filters or using rainwater. There is not good evidence to support specific treatments for long-term poisoning. For acute poisonings treating dehydration is important. Dimercaptosuccinic acid or dimercaptopropane sulfonate may be used while dimercaprol (BAL) is not recommended. Hemodialysis may also be used.

Through drinking water, more than 200 million people globally are exposed to higher-than-safe levels of arsenic. The areas most affected are Bangladesh and West Bengal. Exposure is also more common in people of low income and minorities. Acute poisoning is uncommon. The toxicity of arsenic has been described as far back as 1500 BC in the Ebers papyrus.

Signs and symptoms
Symptoms of arsenic poisoning begin with headaches, confusion, severe diarrhea, and drowsiness. As the poisoning develops, convulsions and changes in fingernail pigmentation called leukonychia striata (Mees's lines, or Aldrich-Mees's lines) may occur. When the poisoning becomes acute, symptoms may include diarrhea, vomiting, vomiting blood, blood in the urine, cramping muscles, hair loss, stomach pain, and more convulsions. The organs of the body that are usually affected by arsenic poisoning are the lungs, skin, kidneys, and liver. The final result of arsenic poisoning is coma and death.

Arsenic is related to heart disease (hypertension-related cardiovascular disease), cancer, stroke (cerebrovascular diseases), chronic lower respiratory diseases, impaired lung function, compromised immune response to H1N1 (swine) flu (a respiratory virus infection and diabetes. Skin effects can include skin cancer in the long term, but often prior to skin cancer are different skin lesions. Other effects may include darkening of skin and thickening of skin.

Chronic exposure to arsenic is related to vitamin A deficiency, which is related to heart disease and night blindness. The acute minimal lethal dose of arsenic in adults is estimated to be 70 to 200 mg or 1 mg/kg/day.

Cancer
Arsenic increases the risk of cancer. Exposure is related to skin, lung, liver, and kidney cancer among others.

Its comutagenic effects may be explained by interference with base and nucleotide excision repair, eventually through interaction with zinc finger structures. Dimethylarsinic acid, DMA(V), caused DNA single strand breaks resulting from inhibition of repair enzymes at levels of 5 to 100 mM in human epithelial  cells.

MMA(III) and DMA(III) were also shown to be directly genotoxic by effectuating scissions in supercoiled ΦX174 DNA. Increased arsenic exposure is associated with an increased frequency of chromosomal aberrations, micronuclei and sister-chromatid exchanges. An explanation for chromosomal aberrations is the sensitivity of the protein tubulin and the mitotic spindle to arsenic. Histological observations confirm effects on cellular integrity, shape and locomotion.

DMA(III) is able to form reactive oxygen species by reaction with molecular oxygen. Resulting metabolites are the dimethylarsenic radical and the dimethylarsenic peroxyl radical.
Both DMA(III) and DMA(V) were shown to release iron from horse spleen as well as from human liver ferritin if ascorbic acid was administered simultaneously. Thus, formation of reactive oxygen species can be promoted.
Moreover, arsenic could cause oxidative stress by depleting the cell's antioxidants, especially the ones containing thiol groups. The accumulation of reactive oxygen species like that cited above and hydroxyl radicals, superoxide radicals and hydrogen peroxides causes aberrant gene expression at low concentrations and lesions of lipids, proteins and DNA in higher concentrations which eventually lead to cellular death.
In a rat animal model, urine levels of 8-hydroxy-2'-deoxyguanosine (as a biomarker of DNA damage byreactive oxygen species) were measured after treatment with DMA(V). In comparison to control levels, they turned out to be significantly increased. This theory is further supported by a cross-sectional study which found elevated mean serum lipid peroxides in the As exposed individuals which correlated with blood levels of inorganic arsenic and methylated metabolites and inversely correlated with nonprotein sulfhydryl (NPSH) levels in whole blood. Another study found an association of As levels in whole blood with the level of reactive oxidants in plasma and an inverse relationship with plasma antioxidants. A finding of the latter study indicates that methylation might in fact be a detoxification pathway with regard to oxidative stress: the results showed that the lower the As methylation capacity was, the lower the level of plasma antioxidant capacity. As reviewed by Kitchin (2001), the oxidative stress theory provides an explanation for the preferred tumor sites connected with arsenic exposure. Considering that a high partial pressure of oxygen is present in lungs and DMA(III) is excreted in gaseous state via the lungs, this seems to be a plausible mechanism for special vulnerability. The fact that DMA is produced by methylation in the liver, excreted via the kidneys and later on stored in the bladder accounts for the other tumor localizations.

Regarding DNA methylation, some studies suggest interaction of As with methyltransferases which leads to an inactivation of tumor suppressor genes through hypermethylation; others state that hypomethylation might occur due to a lack of SAM resulting in aberrant gene activation. An experiment by Zhong et al. (2001) with arsenite-exposed human lung A549, kidney UOK123, UOK109 and UOK121 cells isolated eight different DNA fragments by methylation-sensitive arbitrarily primed polymerase chain reactions. It turned out that six of the fragments were hyper- and two of them were hypomethylated. Higher levels of DNA methyltransferase mRNA and enzyme activity were found.

Kitchin (2001) proposed a model of altered growth factors which lead to cell proliferation and thus to carcinogenesis. From observations, it is known that chronic low-dose arsenic poisoning can lead to increased tolerance to its acute toxicity. MRP1-overexpressing lung tumor GLC4/Sb30 cells poorly accumulate arsenite and arsenate. This is mediated through MRP-1 dependent efflux. The efflux requires glutathione, but no arsenic-glutathione complex formation.

Although many mechanisms have been proposed, no definite model can be given for the mechanisms of chronic arsenic poisoning. The prevailing events of toxicity and carcinogenicity might be quite tissue-specific. Current consensus on the mode of carcinogenesis is that it acts primarily as a tumor promoter. Its co-carcinogenicity has been demonstrated in several models. However, the finding of several studies that chronically arsenic-exposed Andean populations (as most extremely exposed to UV-light) do not develop skin cancer with chronic arsenic exposure, is puzzling.

Causes
Organic arsenic is less harmful than inorganic arsenic. Seafood is a common source of the less toxic organic arsenic in the form of arsenobetaine. The arsenic reported in 2012 in fruit juice and rice by Consumer Reports was primarily inorganic arsenic. Because of its high toxicity, arsenic is seldom used in the Western world, although in Asia it is still a popular pesticide. Arsenic is mainly encountered occupationally in the smelting of zinc and copper ores.

Drinking water
Arsenic is naturally found in groundwater and presents serious health threats when high amounts exist. Chronic arsenic poisoning results from drinking contaminated well water over a long period of time. Many aquifers contain high concentration of arsenic salts.  The World Health Organization (WHO) Guidelines for drinking water quality established in 1993 a provisional guideline value of 0.01 mg/L (10 parts per billion) for maximum contaminant levels of arsenic in drinking water. This recommendation was established based on the limit of detection for most laboratories' testing equipment at the time of publication of the WHO water quality guidelines. More recent findings show that consumption of water with levels as low as 0.00017 mg/L (0.17 parts per billion) over long periods of time can lead to arsenicosis.

From a 1988 study in China, the US protection agency quantified the lifetime exposure of arsenic in drinking water at concentrations of 0.0017 mg/L (1.7 ppb), 0.00017 mg/L, and 0.000017 mg/L are associated with a lifetime skin cancer risk of 1 in 10,000, 1 in 100,000, and 1 in 1,000,000 respectively. WHO asserts that a water level of 0.01 mg/L (10 ppb) poses a risk of 6 in 10,000 chance of lifetime skin cancer risk and contends that this level of risk is acceptable.

One of the worst incidents of arsenic poisoning via well water occurred in Bangladesh, which the World Health Organization called the "largest mass poisoning of a population in history" recognized as a major public health concern. The contamination in the Ganga-Brahmaputra fluvial plains in India and Padma-Meghna fluvial plains in Bangladesh demonstrated adverse impacts on human health.

Mining techniques such as hydraulic fracturing may mobilize arsenic in groundwater and aquifers due to enhanced methane transport and resulting changes in redox conditions, and inject fluid containing additional arsenic.

Groundwater

In the US, the U.S. Geological Survey estimates that the median groundwater concentration is 1 μg/L or less, although some groundwater aquifers, particularly in the western United States, can contain much higher levels. For example, median levels in Nevada were about 8 μg/L but levels of naturally occurring arsenic as high as 1000 μg/L have been measured in the United States in drinking water.

Geothermally active zones occur at hotspots where mantle-derived plumes ascend, such as in Hawaii and Yellowstone National Park, US. Arsenic is an incompatible element (does not fit easily into the lattices of common rock-forming minerals). Concentrations of arsenic are high mainly in geothermal waters that leach continental rocks. Arsenic in hot geothermal fluids was shown to be derived mainly from leaching of host rocks at Yellowstone National Park, in Wyoming, US, rather than from magmas.

In the western US, there are As (arsenic) inputs to groundwater and surface water from geothermal fluids in and near Yellowstone National Park, and in other western mineralized areas. Groundwater associated with volcanics in California contain As at concentrations ranging up to 48,000 μg/L, with As-bearing sulfide minerals as the main source. Geothermal waters on Dominica in the Lesser Antilles also contain concentrations of As >50 μg/L.

In general, because arsenic is an incompatible element, it accumulates in differentiated magmas, and in other western mineralized areas. Weathering of pegmatite veins in Connecticut, US, was thought to contribute As to groundwater.

Arsenic poisoning from exposure to groundwater is believed to be responsible for the illness experienced by those that witnessed the 2007 Carancas impact event in Peru, as local residents inhaled steam which was contaminated with arsenic, produced from groundwater which boiled from the intense heat and pressure produced by a chondrite meteorite impacting the ground.

In Pennsylvania, As concentrations in water discharging from abandoned anthracite mines ranged from <0.03 to 15 μg/L and from abandoned bituminous mines, from 0.10 to 64 μg/L, with 10% of samples exceeding the United States Environmental Protection Agency MLC of 10 μg/L.

In Wisconsin, As concentrations of water in sandstone and dolomite aquifers were as high as 100 μg/L. Oxidation of pyrite hosted by these formations was the likely source of the As.

In the Piedmont of Pennsylvania and New Jersey, groundwater in Mesozoic age aquifers contains elevated levels of As—domestic well waters from Pennsylvania contained up to 65 μg/L, whereas in New Jersey the highest concentration measured recently was 215 μg/L.

Food
In the United States, Schoof et al. estimated an average adult intake of 3.2 μg/day, with a range of 1–20 μg/day. Estimates for children were similar. Food also contains many organic arsenic compounds. The key organic arsenic compounds that can be routinely found in food (depending on food type) include monomethylarsonic acid (MMAsV), dimethylarsinic acid (DMAsV), arsenobetaine, arsenocholine, arsenosugars, and arsenolipids. DMAsV or MMAsV can be found in various types of fin fish, crabs, and mollusks, but often at very low levels.

Arsenobetaine is the major form of arsenic in marine animals, and, by all accounts, it is considered a compound that is nontoxic under conditions of human consumption. Arsenocholine, which is mainly found in shrimp, is chemically similar to arsenobetaine, and is considered to be "essentially nontoxic". Although arsenobetaine is little studied, available information indicates it is not mutagenic, immunotoxic, or embryotoxic.

Arsenosugars and arsenolipids have recently been identified. Exposure to these compounds and toxicological implications are currently being studied. Arsenosugars are detected mainly in seaweed but are also found to a lesser extent in marine mollusks. Studies addressing arsenosugar toxicity, however, have largely been limited to in vitro studies, which show that arsenosugars are significantly less toxic than both inorganic arsenic and trivalent methylated arsenic metabolites.

It has been found that rice is particularly susceptible to accumulation of arsenic from soil.  Rice grown in the United States has an average 260 ppb of arsenic, according to a study; but U.S. arsenic intake remains far below World Health Organization-recommended limits.  China has set a standard for arsenic limits in food (150 ppb), as levels in rice exceed those in water.

Arsenic is a ubiquitous element present in American drinking water. In the United States, levels of arsenic that are above natural levels, but still well below danger levels set in federal safety standards, have been detected in commercially raised chickens. The source of the arsenic appears to be the feed additives roxarsone and nitarsone, which are used to control the parasitic infection coccidiosis as well as to increase weight and skin coloring of the poultry.

High levels of inorganic arsenic were reportedly found in 83 California wines in 2015.

Soil

Exposure to arsenic in soil can occur through multiple pathways. Compared with the intake of naturally occurring arsenic from water and the diet, soil arsenic constitutes only a small fraction of intake.

Air
The European Commission (2000) reports that levels of arsenic in air range 0–1 ng/m3 in remote areas, 0.2–1.5 ng/m3 in rural areas, 0.5–3 ng/m3 in urban areas, and up to about 50 ng/m3 in the vicinity of industrial sites. Based on these data, the European Commission (2000) estimated that in relation to food, cigarette smoking, water, and soil, air contributes less than 1% of total arsenic exposure.

Pesticides
The use of lead arsenate pesticides has been effectively eliminated for over 50 years. However, because of the pesticide's environmental persistence, it is estimated that millions of acres of land are still contaminated with lead arsenate residues. This presents a potentially significant public health concern in some areas of the United States (e.g., New Jersey, Washington, and Wisconsin), where large areas of land used historically as orchards have been converted into residential developments.

Some modern uses of arsenic-based pesticides still exist. Chromated copper arsenate has been registered for use in the United States since the 1940s as a wood preservative, protecting wood from insects and microbial agents. In 2003, manufacturers of chromated copper arsenate instituted a voluntary recall of residential uses of wood treated with the chemical. The Environmental Protection Agency Act2008 final report stated that chromated copper arsenate is still approved for use in nonresidential applications, such as in marine facilities (pilings and structures), utility poles, and sand highway structures.

Copper smelting
Exposure studies in the copper smelting industry are much more extensive and have established definitive links between arsenic, a by-product of copper smelting, and lung cancer via inhalation. Dermal and neurological effects were also increased in some of these studies. Although as time went on, occupational controls became more stringent and workers were exposed to reduced arsenic concentrations, the arsenic exposures measured from these studies ranged from about 0.05 to 0.3 mg/m3 and are significantly higher than airborne environmental exposures to arsenic (which range from 0 to 0.000003 mg/m3).

Pathophysiology
Arsenic interferes with cellular longevity by allosteric inhibition of an essential metabolic enzyme pyruvate dehydrogenase complex, which catalyzes the oxidation of pyruvate to acetyl-CoA by NAD+. With the enzyme inhibited, the energy system of the cell is disrupted resulting in cellular apoptosis. Biochemically, arsenic prevents use of thiamine resulting in a clinical picture resembling thiamine deficiency. Poisoning with arsenic can raise lactate levels and lead to lactic acidosis. Low potassium levels in the cells increases the risk of experiencing a life-threatening heart rhythm problem from arsenic trioxide.
Arsenic in cells clearly stimulates the production of hydrogen peroxide (H2O2). When the H2O2 reacts with certain metals such as iron or manganese it produces a highly reactive hydroxyl radical. Inorganic arsenic trioxide found in ground water particularly affects voltage-gated potassium channels,
disrupting cellular electrolytic function resulting in neurological disturbances, cardiovascular episodes such as prolonged QT interval, neutropenia, high blood pressure,
central nervous system dysfunction, anemia, and death.

Arsenic has also been shown to induce cardiac hypertrophy by activating certain transcription factors involved in pathologically remodeling the heart. Tissue culture studies have shown that arsenic compounds block both IKr and Iks channels and, at the same time, activate IK-ATP channels. Arsenic compounds also disrupt ATP production through several mechanisms. At the level of the citric acid cycle, arsenic inhibits pyruvate dehydrogenase and by competing with phosphate it uncouples oxidative phosphorylation, thus inhibiting energy-linked reduction of NAD+, mitochondrial respiration, and ATP synthesis. Hydrogen peroxide production is also increased, which might form reactive oxygen species and oxidative stress. These metabolic interferences lead to death from multi-system organ failure, probably from necrotic cell death, not apoptosis. A post mortem reveals brick red colored mucosa, due to severe hemorrhage.  Although arsenic causes toxicity, it can also play a protective role.

Mechanism
Arsenite inhibits not only the formation of acetyl-CoA but also the enzyme succinic dehydrogenase. Arsenate can replace phosphate in many reactions. It is able to form Glc-6-arsenate in vitro; therefore it has been argued that hexokinase could be inhibited. (Eventually this may be a mechanism leading to muscle weakness in chronic arsenic poisoning.) In the glyceraldehyde 3-phosphate dehydrogenase reaction arsenate attacks the enzyme-bound thioester. The formed 1-arseno-3-phosphoglycerate is unstable and hydrolyzes spontaneously. Thus, ATP formation in glycolysis is inhibited while bypassing the phosphoglycerate kinase reaction. (Moreover, the formation of 2,3-bisphosphoglycerate in erythrocytes might be affected, followed by a higher oxygen affinity of hemoglobin and subsequently enhanced cyanosis.) As shown by Gresser (1981), submitochondrial particles synthesize adenosine-5'-diphosphate-arsenate from ADP and arsenate in presence of succinate. Thus, by a variety of mechanisms arsenate leads to an impairment of cell respiration and subsequently diminished ATP formation. This is consistent with observed ATP depletion of exposed cells and histopathological findings of mitochondrial and cell swelling, glycogen depletion in liver cells and fatty change in liver, heart and kidney.

Experiments demonstrated enhanced arterial thrombosis in a rat animal model, elevations of serotonin levels, thromboxane A[2] and adhesion proteins in platelets, while human platelets showed similar responses. The effect on vascular endothelium may eventually be mediated by the arsenic-induced formation of nitric oxide.
It was demonstrated that +3 As concentrations substantially lower than concentrations required for inhibition of the lysosomal protease cathepsin L in B cell line TA3 were sufficient to trigger apoptosis in the same B cell line, while the latter could be a mechanism mediating immunosuppressive effects.

Kinetics
The two forms of inorganic arsenic, reduced (trivalent As(III)) and oxidized (pentavalent As(V)), can be absorbed, and accumulated in tissues and body fluids. In the liver, the metabolism of arsenic involves enzymatic and non-enzymatic methylation; the most frequently excreted metabolite (≥ 90%) in the urine of mammals is dimethylarsinic acid or cacodylic acid, DMA(V). Dimethylarsenic acid is also known as Agent Blue and was used as herbicide in the American war in Vietnam.

In humans inorganic arsenic is reduced nonenzymatically from pentoxide to trioxide, using glutathione or it is mediated by enzymes. Reduction of arsenic pentoxide to arsenic trioxide increases its toxicity and bio availability, Methylation occurs through methyltransferase enzymes. S-adenosylmethionine (SAM) may serve as methyl donor. Various pathways are used, the principal route being dependent on the current environment of the cell. Resulting metabolites are monomethylarsonous acid, MMA(III), and dimethylarsinous acid, DMA(III).

Methylation had been regarded as a detoxification process,  but reduction from +5 As to +3 As may be considered as a bioactivation  instead. Another suggestion is that methylation might be a detoxification if "As[III] intermediates are not permitted to accumulate" because the pentavalent organoarsenics have a lower affinity to thiol groups than inorganic pentavalent arsenics. Gebel (2002) stated that methylation is a detoxification through accelerated excretion. With regard to carcinogenicity it has been suggested that methylation should be regarded as a toxification.

Arsenic, especially +3 As, binds to single, but with higher affinity to vicinal sulfhydryl groups, thus reacts with a variety of proteins and inhibits their activity. It was also proposed that binding of arsenite at nonessential sites might contribute to detoxification. Arsenite inhibits members of the disulfide oxidoreductase family like glutathione reductase and thioredoxin reductase.

The remaining unbound arsenic (≤ 10%) accumulates in cells, which over time may lead to skin, bladder, kidney, liver, lung, and prostate cancers. Other forms of arsenic toxicity in humans have been observed in blood, bone marrow, cardiac, central nervous system, gastrointestinal, gonadal, kidney, liver, pancreatic, and skin tissues.

Heat shock response
Another aspect is the similarity of arsenic effects to the heat shock response. Short-term arsenic exposure has effects on signal transduction inducing heat shock proteins with masses of 27, 60, 70, 72, 90, and 110 kDa as well as metallothionein, ubiquitin, mitogen-activated [MAP] kinases, extracellular regulated kinase [ERK], c-jun terminal kinases [JNK] and p38.
Via JNK and p38 it activates c-fos, c-jun and egr-1 which are usually activated by growth factors and cytokines. The effects are largely dependent on the dosing regime and may be as well inversed.

As shown by some experiments reviewed by Del Razo (2001), reactive oxygen species induced by low levels of inorganic arsenic increase the transcription and the activity of the activator protein 1 (AP-1) and the nuclear factor-κB (NF-κB) (maybe enhanced by elevated MAPK levels), which results in c-fos/c-jun activation, over-secretion of pro-inflammatory and growth promoting cytokines stimulating cell proliferation. Germolec et al. (1996) found an increased cytokine expression and cell proliferation in skin biopsies from individuals chronically exposed to arsenic-contaminated drinking water.

Increased AP-1 and NF-κB obviously also result in an up-regulation of mdm2 protein, which decreases p53 protein levels. Thus, taking into account p53's function, a lack of it could cause a faster accumulation of mutations contributing to carcinogenesis. However, high levels of inorganic arsenic inhibit NF-κB activation and cell proliferation. An experiment of Hu et al. (2002) demonstrated increased binding activity of AP-1 and NF-κB after acute (24 h) exposure to +3 sodium arsenite, whereas long-term exposure (10–12 weeks) yielded the opposite result. The authors conclude that the former may be interpreted as a defense response while the latter could lead to carcinogenesis. As the contradicting findings and connected mechanistic hypotheses indicate, there is a difference in acute and chronic effects of arsenic on signal transduction which is not clearly understood yet.

Oxidative stress
Studies have demonstrated that the oxidative stress generated by arsenic may disrupt the signal transduction pathways of the nuclear transcriptional factors PPARs, AP-1, and NF-κB, as well as the pro-inflammatory cytokines IL-8 and TNF-α.  The interference of oxidative stress with signal transduction pathways may affect physiological processes associated with cell growth, metabolic syndrome X, glucose homeostasis, lipid metabolism, obesity, insulin resistance, inflammation, and diabetes-2. Recent scientific evidence has elucidated the physiological roles of the PPARs in the ω- hydroxylation of fatty acids and the inhibition of pro-inflammatory transcription factors (NF-κB and AP-1), pro-inflammatory cytokines (IL-1, -6, -8, -12, and TNF-α), cell4 adhesion molecules (ICAM-1 and VCAM-1), inducible nitric oxide synthase, proinflammatory nitric oxide (NO), and anti-apoptotic factors.

Epidemiological studies have suggested a correlation between chronic consumption of drinking water contaminated with arsenic and the incidence of type 2 diabetes. The human liver after exposure to therapeutic drugs may exhibit hepatic non-cirrhotic portal hypertension, fibrosis, and cirrhosis. However, the literature provides insufficient scientific evidence to show cause and effect between arsenic and the onset of diabetes mellitus Type 2.

Diagnosis
Arsenic may be measured in blood or urine to monitor excessive environmental or occupational exposure, confirm a diagnosis of poisoning in hospitalized victims or to assist in the forensic investigation in a case of fatal over dosage. Some analytical techniques are capable of distinguishing organic from inorganic forms of the element. Organic arsenic compounds tend to be eliminated in the urine in unchanged form, while inorganic forms are largely converted to organic arsenic compounds in the body prior to urinary excretion. The current biological exposure index for U.S. workers of 35 µg/L total urinary arsenic may easily be exceeded by a healthy person eating a seafood meal.

Tests are available to diagnose poisoning by measuring arsenic in blood, urine, hair, and fingernails. The urine test is the most reliable test for arsenic exposure within the last few days. Urine testing needs to be done within 24–48 hours for an accurate analysis of an acute exposure. Tests on hair and fingernails can measure exposure to high levels of arsenic over the past 6–12 months. These tests can determine if one has been exposed to above-average levels of arsenic. They cannot predict, however, whether the arsenic levels in the body will affect health. Chronic arsenic exposure can remain in the body systems for a longer period of time than a shorter term or more isolated exposure and can be detected in a longer time frame after the introduction of the arsenic, important in trying to determine the source of the exposure.

Hair is a potential bioindicator for arsenic exposure due to its ability to store trace elements from blood. Incorporated elements maintain their position during growth of hair. Thus for a temporal estimation of exposure, an assay of hair composition needs to be carried out with a single hair which is not possible with older techniques requiring homogenization and dissolution of several strands of hair. This type of biomonitoring has been achieved with newer microanalytical techniques like synchrotron radiation based X-ray fluorescence spectroscopy and microparticle induced X-ray emission. The highly focused and intense beams study small spots on biological samples allowing analysis to micro level along with the chemical speciation. In a study, this method has been used to follow arsenic level before, during and after treatment with arsenious oxide in patients with acute promyelocytic leukemia.

Treatment

Chelation
Dimercaprol and dimercaptosuccinic acid are chelating agents that sequester the arsenic away from blood proteins and are used in treating acute arsenic poisoning.  The most important side effect is hypertension.  Dimercaprol is considerably more toxic than succimer. dimercaptosuccinic acid monoesters, e.g. MiADMSA, are promising antidotes for arsenic poisoning.

Nutrition
Supplemental potassium decreases the risk of experiencing a life-threatening heart rhythm problem from arsenic trioxide.

History

Beginning in about 3000 BC arsenic was mined and added to copper in the alloying of bronze, but the adverse health effects of working with arsenic led to it being abandoned when a viable alternative, tin, was discovered.

In addition to its presence as a poison, for centuries arsenic was used medicinally. It has been used for over 2,400 years as a part of traditional Chinese medicine. In the western world, arsenic compounds, such as salvarsan, were used extensively to treat syphilis before penicillin was introduced. It was eventually replaced as a therapeutic agent by sulfa drugs and then by other antibiotics. Arsenic was also an ingredient in many tonics (or "patent medicines").

In addition, during the Elizabethan era, some women used a mixture of vinegar, chalk, and arsenic applied topically to whiten their skin. This use of arsenic was intended to prevent aging and creasing of the skin, but some arsenic was inevitably absorbed into the blood stream.

During the Victorian era (late 19th century) in the United States, U.S. newspapers advertised "arsenic complexion wafers" that promised to remove facial blemishes such as moles and pimples.

Some pigments, most notably the popular Emerald Green (known also under several other names), were based on arsenic compounds. Overexposure to these pigments was a frequent cause of accidental poisoning of artists and craftsmen.

Arsenic became a favored method for murder of the Middle Ages and Renaissance, particularly among ruling classes in Italy allegedly. Because the symptoms are similar to those of cholera, which was common at the time, arsenic poisoning often went undetected.  By the 19th century, it had acquired the nickname "inheritance powder," perhaps because impatient heirs were known or suspected to use it to ensure or accelerate their inheritances. It was also a common murder technique in the 19th century in domestic violence situations, such as the case of Rebecca Copin, who attempted to poison her husband by "putting arsenic in his coffee".

In post-WW1 Hungary, arsenic extracted by boiling fly paper was used in an estimated 300 murders by the Angel Makers of Nagyrév.

In imperial China, arsenic trioxide and sulfides were used in murder, as well as for capital punishment for members of the royal family or aristocracy.  Forensic studies have determined that the Guangxu Emperor (d. 1908) was murdered by arsenic, most likely ordered by the Empress Dowager Cixi or Generalissimo Yuan Shikai.  Likewise, in ancient Korea, and particularly in the Joseon Dynasty, arsenic-sulfur compounds have been used as a major ingredient of sayak (사약; 賜藥), which was a poison cocktail used in capital punishment of high-profile political figures and members of the royal family. Due to social and political prominence of the condemned, many of these events were well-documented, often in the Annals of Joseon Dynasty; they are sometimes portrayed in historical television miniseries because of their dramatic nature.

Legislation 
In the U.S. in 1975, under the authority of the Safe Drinking Water Act, the U.S. Environmental Protection Agency determined the National Interim Primary Drinking Water Regulation levels of arsenic (inorganic contaminant – IOCs) to be 0.05 mg/L (50 parts per billion – ppb).

Throughout the years, many studies reported dose-dependent effects of arsenic in drinking water and skin cancer. In order to prevent new cases and death from cancerous and non-cancerous diseases, the Safe Drinking Water Act directed the Environmental Protection Agency to revise arsenic's levels and specified the maximum contaminant level (MCL). MCLs are set as close to the health goals as possible, considering cost, benefits and the ability of public water systems to detect and remove contaminants using suitable treatment technologies.

In 2001, Environmental Protection Agency adopted a lower standard of MCL 0.01 mg/L (10 ppb) for arsenic in drinking water that applies to both community water systems and non-transient non-community water systems.

In some other countries, when developing national drinking water standards based on the guideline values, it is necessary to take account of a variety of geographical, socio-economic, dietary and other conditions affecting potential exposure. These factors lead to national standards that differ appreciably from the guideline values. That is the case in countries such as India and Bangladesh, where the permissible limit of arsenic in absence of an alternative source of water is 0.05 mg/L.

Challenges to implementation 

Arsenic removal technologies are traditional treatment processes which have been tailored to improve removal of arsenic from drinking water. Although some of the removal processes, such as precipitative processes, adsorption processes, ion exchange processes, and separation (membrane) processes, may be technically feasible, their cost may be prohibitive.

For underdeveloped countries, the challenge is finding the means to fund such technologies. The Environmental Protection Agency, for example, has estimated the total national annualized cost of treatment, monitoring, reporting, record keeping, and administration to enforce the MCL rule to be approximately $181 million. Most of the cost is due to the installation and operation of the treatment technologies needed to reduce arsenic in public water systems.

Pregnancy
Arsenic exposure through groundwater is highly concerning throughout the perinatal period. Pregnant women are a high-risk population because not only are the mothers at risk for adverse outcomes, but in-utero exposure also poses health risks to the infant.

There is a dose-dependent relationship between maternal exposure to arsenic and infant mortality, meaning that infants born to women exposed to higher concentrations, or exposed for longer periods of time, have a higher mortality rate.

Studies have shown that ingesting arsenic through groundwater during pregnancy poses dangers to the mother including, but not limited to abdominal pain, vomiting, diarrhea, skin pigmentation changes, and cancer. Research has also demonstrated that arsenic exposure also causes low birth weight, low birth size, infant mortality, and a variety of other outcomes in infants. Some of these effects, like lower birth-rate and size may be due to the effects of arsenic on maternal weight gain during pregnancy.

See also
 2007 Peruvian meteorite event – a meteorite impact believed to have caused arsenic poisoning
 Arsenic contamination of groundwater
 Mary Ann Cotton – serial arsenic poisoner
 Felicia Dorothea Kate Dover –  arsenic poisoner
 James Marsh (chemist) – invented the Marsh test for detecting arsenic
 Toroku arsenic disease
 The Pardoner's Tale - Chaucerian tale featuring murder with ratsbane
 Madame Bovary - fictional suicide by arsenic
 Lady Macbeth of the Mtsensk District (novella) - fictional murder by arsenical rat poison

References

Further reading
 Atlas (color) of Chronic Arsenic Poisoning (2010), Nobuyuki Hotta, Ichiro Kikuchi, Yasuko Kojo, Sakuragaoka Hospital, Kumamoto, .
 A 2011 article in the journal Social Medicine discusses community interventions to combat arsenic poisoning: Beyond medical treatment, arsenic poisoning in rural Bangladesh.
 D. J. Vaughan and D. A. Polya (2013): Arsenic – the great poisoner revisited. Elements 9, 315–316. PDF (update on the world situation in 2013)

External links
 

 
Biology and pharmacology of chemical elements
Arsenic in biology
Disturbances of human pigmentation
Element toxicology
Toxic effects of metals
Toxic effects of substances chiefly nonmedicinal as to source
Toxicology
Wikipedia medicine articles ready to translate
Wikipedia emergency medicine articles ready to translate